Tatsuo (written: , , , , , , , , , , , , , , , , ,  or ) is a masculine Japanese given name. Notable people with the name include:

, Japanese actor
, Japanese engineer
Tatsuo Fukuda (福田達夫, born 1967), Japanese politician
, Japanese swimmer
, Japanese automotive engineer
, Japanese politician
, Japanese writer, poet and translator
, Japanese ice hockey player
, Japanese artist
Tatsuo Itoh, American academic
, Japanese water polo player
, Japanese judge
, Japanese singer-songwriter
, Japanese politician
, Japanese diplomat and writer
, Japanese sport wrestler
, Japanese baseball player
, Japanese cross-country skier
, Japanese computer scientist
, Japanese photographer
, Japanese writer
, Japanese linguist
, Japanese sport wrestler
, Japanese anime director
, Japanese politician
, Japanese karateka
, Japanese sprinter
, Japanese cinematographer
, Japanese karateka
, Japanese decathlete
, Japanese ornithologist and academic
, Japanese ski jumper
, Japanese politician
, Japanese actor
, Japanese karateka
, Japanese politician
, Japanese illustrator and character designer

See also
2957 Tatsuo, a main-belt asteroid
Tetsuo (given name)

Japanese masculine given names